Gwyer is a surname. Notable people with the surname include:

Barbara Gwyer (1881–1974), British academic administrator
Herbert Gwyer (died 1960), British Anglican bishop in Southern Africa
Maurice Gwyer (1878–1952), British lawyer, judge, and academic administrator

See also
Dwyer (name)